Johan Martinius Antonsen Dokka (born 30 August 1881) was a Norwegian politician.

He was born in Kongsberg to Anton Dokka and Martine Halvorsen. He was elected representative to the Storting for the period 1931–1933, for the Liberal Party.

References

1881 births
Year of death missing
People from Kongsberg
Liberal Party (Norway) politicians
Members of the Storting